Daniel Malescha (born 28 April 1994 in Munich) is a German volleyball player, a member of the club United Volleys Frankfurt.

Sporting achievements

Clubs 
German Cup:
  2016, 2017, 2018
German SuperCup:
  2017, 2018, 2019
Deutsche Championship:
  2017, 2018, 2019

References

External links
VFB-Volleyball profile 
Volleyball-Verband profile
Volleyball.World profile
Volleybox profile
CEV profile

1994 births
Living people
German men's volleyball players
21st-century German people